Ultimate Party is an annual Japanese professional wrestling event promoted by DDT Pro-Wrestling (DDT). The event has been held since 2019 and aired as an internet pay-per-view (iPPV) on DDT's streaming service Wrestle Universe and on AbemaTV. The event is usually held on November 3.

Events

References

External links
The official DDT Pro-Wrestling website

 
DDT Pro-Wrestling shows